Dwight Henry Bennett (November 19, 1917 – July 10, 2002) was an aeronautical engineer and one of the early developers of the control configured vehicle (CCV) concept. He won the Wright Brothers Medal in 1972 with R. P. Johannes  for the paper Combat Capabilities and Versatility Through CCV, discussing its applications.

Biography
He was born on November 19, 1917 in Oklahoma City. Bennett graduated with a BS in Mechanical engineering (ME) from Caltech in 1940, married the former Katherine Mason, and had 3 children. He joined the San Diego Division of Convair, where he worked on the Sea Dart, F-102, F-104 amongst others, for 23 years ultimately rising to Vice President and Assistant to the General Manager. He had flown Mach 2 by 1959. He was Vice President of Aero Commander Aircraft from 1963 through 1964 before moving on to McDonnell Aircraft where he worked on the  Breguet 941/McDonnell 188 S.T.O.L. Transport, F-4 Phantom, ending with the F/A-18 Hornet at Northrup, as a director of program engineering. Bennett was also an active flight instructor in all ratings for forty years. He died on July 10, 2002 at the age of 84, in San Diego, California.

Awards

Wright Brothers Medal, 1972

References 

American aerospace engineers
1917 births
2002 deaths
20th-century American engineers